219th may refer to:

219th Battlefield Surveillance Brigade (United States), a Battlefield Surveillance Brigade in the US Army National Guard
219th Electronics Engineering and Radar Installation Squadron (219th EIS) an Air National Guard squadron in Tulsa, Oklahoma
219th Highland Battalion (Nova Scotia), CEF, a unit in the Canadian Expeditionary Force during the First World War
219th Street (IRT White Plains Road Line), a local station on the IRT White Plains Road Line of the New York City Subway

See also
219 (number)
219, the year 219 (CCXIX) of the Julian calendar
219 BC